The Australian golden whistler (Pachycephala pectoralis) or golden whistler, is a species of bird found in forest, woodland, mallee, mangrove and scrub in Australia (except the interior and most of the north) Most populations are resident, but some in south-eastern Australia migrate north during the winter. Its taxonomy is highly complex and remains a matter of dispute, with some authorities including as many as 59 subspecies of the golden whistler (one of the highest numbers of subspecies in any bird), while others treat several of these as separate species.

Taxonomy and systematics
The Australian golden whistler was originally described in the genus Muscicapa by the English ornithologist John Latham in 1801.

Subspecies
The taxonomy of the golden whistler complex is difficult, and remains a matter of dispute. Some authorities include a wide range of – often strikingly different – taxa from Indonesia, East Timor, Papua New Guinea, the Solomon Islands, Vanuatu and Fiji as subspecies of P. pectoralis, in which case the combined species simply is known as the golden whistler (a common name sometimes also used exclusively for the Australian species).

Presently, six remaining subspecies are recognized:
 P. p. pectoralis - (Latham, 1801): Found in eastern Australia
 Norfolk golden whistler (P. p. xanthoprocta) - Gould, 1838: Originally described as a separate species. Found on Norfolk Island (Australia). 
 Lord Howe golden whistler (P. p. contempta) - Hartert, 1898: Originally described as a separate species. Found on Lord Howe Island (Australia). 
 P. p. youngi - Mathews, 1912: Found in south-eastern Australia
 P. p. glaucura - Gould, 1845: Originally described as a separate species. Found in Tasmania and the Bass Strait Islands (Australia)
 P. p. fuliginosa - Vigors & Horsfield, 1827: Originally described as a separate species. Found in south-central Australia

Some authorities also consider the following related species as subspecies of the Australian golden whistler:
 Rusty-breasted (fulvous-tinted) whistler from south-western Wallacea, Bali and Java in Indonesia.
 Yellow-throated whistler from central and south-eastern Wallacea.
 Baliem whistler from west-central New Guinea.
 Black-chinned whistler from North Maluku in Indonesia.
 Bismarck whistler from the Bismarck and Louisiade Archipelagos in Papua New Guinea.
 Oriole whistler from the Solomons (except Santa Cruz Islands), and the islands of Bougainville and Buka in far eastern Papua New Guinea.
 Fiji whistler from central and northern islands in Fiji.
 White-throated whistler from southern islands in Fiji, and the central and northern Santa Cruz Islands in the Solomons.

Additionally, all except the nominate subspecies of the Melanesian whistler  are sometimes included as subspecies of P. pectoralis (in which case P. caledonica is known as the New Caledonian whistler). Historically even the New Caledonian, Tongan and Samoan whistler have been treated as subspecies of P. pectoralis. Strong published evidence in favour of either treatment is limited, and further study is warranted to resolve the situation.

Description

The male has a bright yellow underside and nape, olive-green back and wings, a black head and chest-band, and a white throat. A notable exception is the Norfolk golden whistler (P. p. xanthoprocta) where the plumage of the male is female-like. In Australia females are overall dull brownish-grey, though some have yellowish undertail coverts. Both sexes have a black bill, dark legs and red-brown eyes.

Australian golden whistlers have a strong, musical voice.

Distribution and habitat
The Australian golden whistler can be found in almost any wooded habitat, especially dense forests. It eats berries, insects, spiders, and other small arthropods. They usually feed alone and obtain food from the lower to middle tree level, or they may alternatively take part in mixed-species feeding flocks.

Behaviour
This species breeds between September and January. Male and female both work on the nest, which is a shallow bowl made of twigs, grass, and bark, and bound together with spider web. Only one brood is raised per season and both birds share incubation and care of young. Eggs hatch 15 days after they are laid and the young leave the nest after 12 days.

Status
The Australian golden whistler is considered to be of least concern, and it is generally described as common to fairly common.

The Norfolk golden whistler (P. p. xanthoprocta) declined for many years due to habitat loss and fragmentation and possibly also due to introduced predators such as the black rat. Most of the population is now restricted to the Norfolk Island National Park. This has resulted in it being listed as vulnerable by the Australian Government. Another island subspecies, the Lord Howe golden whistler (P. p. contempta) remains common, but was listed as vulnerable by the Australian Government due to its small range. It is not listed anymore.

References

External links 

 Golden whistler videos, photos & sounds on the Internet Bird Collection

Australian golden whistler
Australian golden whistler
Birds of the Maluku Islands
Birds of the Lesser Sunda Islands
Birds of Melanesia
Australian golden whistler
Articles containing video clips